This list of fictional ungulates in animation is subsidiary to the list of fictional animals and is sorted by species. The list is restricted to notable ungulate (hooved) characters from various animated works. This list includes deer, moose, bovids, giraffes, camels, donkeys, and zebras, but excludes fictional horses, fictional pigs, and fictional pachyderms as each has its own list.

References

Fictional ungulates
Lists of fictional animals in animation